The Producers Guild Film Awards for Best Lyricist (previously known as the Apsara Award for Best Lyricist) is given by the producers of the film and television guild as part of its annual award ceremony to recognise the best Indian film of the year. Following its inception in 2004, no one was awarded in 2005 and 2007.

Winner and nominees

2000s
 2004 Javed Akhtar - "Kal Ho Naa Ho" - Kal Ho Naa Ho
 Ibrahim Ashq - "Koi Mil Gaya" - Koi... Mil Gaya
 Javed Akhtar - "Seemaaye Bulaaye"  - LOC Kargil
 Gulzar - "Maar Udari" - Pinjar
 2005 - no award
 2006 Gulzar - "Kajra Re" - Bunty Aur Babli
 Swanand Kirkire - "Piyu Bole" - Parineeta
 Swanand Kirkire - "Baanwara Mann" - Hazaaron Khwaishein Aisi
 Sayeed Quadri - "Bheegey Hont" - Murder
 Javed Akhtar - "Do Pal" - Veer-Zaara
 2007 - no award
 2008 Gulzar - "Tere Bina" - Guru (2007 film)
 Sayeed Quadri - "Maula Mera" - Anwar
 Sandeep Nath - "Yoon Shabnami" - Saawariya
 Sameer - "Jab Se Tere Naina" - Saawariya
 Javed Akhtar - "Ajab Si" - Om Shanti Om
 2009 Prasoon Joshi - "Maa" - Taare Zameen Par
 Javed Akhtar - "Khwaja" - Jodhaa Akbar
 Abbas Tyrewala - "Pappu Can't Dance" - Jaane Tu... Ya Jaane Na
 Irfan Siddiqui - "Mar Jaava" - Fashion
 Gulzar - "Tu Meri Dost Hain" - Yuvvraaj

References

Producers Guild Film Awards